Silylidyne is a chemical substance occurring as a molecule found in stars and probably existing in interstellar space, or as a monolayer on the surface of solid silicon. The SiH molecule is a radical, and can be made experimentally by striking an electric arc to silicon on a low pressure hydrogen gas.

Surface
As a surface layer, silicon hydrides form when the silicon is cleaned with hydrofluoric acid. This surface hydrogen SiH decomposes when heated to 750 K. Other ways to coat a silicon surface in hydrogen is via reaction with atomic hydrogen, or hot silane. A (111) crystal face will become covered in the pure monohydride, but other faces on a silicon crystal will also have the dihydride and trihydride groups.

Group
The silylidyne group, not to be confused with silylidyne, is a ≡SiH group that is bonded with a triple bond. The hydrogen can be substituted by other groups to make a more generic family of silylidynes. It is known as a ligand on molybdenum.

Natural occurrence
Silicon monohydride in space was first noticed in sun spots in 1933. Later on it was found on the solar disk, photosphere, and in cool stars. Mira variable stars of type M or S may have emission lines of SiH. In even cooler brown dwarfs and planets, SiH is not found, but instead silicon takes form as silicon monoxide at low pressures, and SiH4 at high pressures. Minute amounts of SiH as a transient species may be found in these bodies as SiO and SiH4 react with water.

Properties
The Si-H bond strength is 80 kcal/mol.

Spectrum
The most prominent spectral band is due to A2Δ → X2Π transitions. Higher level excited states are the B2Σ− and C2Σ+, D2Δ, E2Σ+.

The life time of the molecules in the A state is 530 nanoseconds. They decay to the X ground state.

References

Silanes